Josef Håkestad (25 August 1907 – 25 October 1977) was a Norwegian footballer. He played in two matches for the Norway national football team in 1935.

References

External links
 

1907 births
1977 deaths
Norwegian footballers
Norway international footballers
Place of birth missing
Association footballers not categorized by position